Ibrahim Halidi (1954— February 23, 2020 is a long-time politician in Comoros. Halidi was the Prime Minister of Comoros from January to May 1993. Halidi also ran for president in May 2006 with the backing of the outgoing president, Azali Assoumani. In the first round of the election, Halidi finished in third place with 10.37% and qualified for the presidential second round, which was held on 14 May. Halidi lost the presidential election to Ahmed Abdallah Sambi. Ibrahim Halidi was supported by the Islands' Fraternity and Unity Party (CHUMA), Convention for the Renewal of the Comoros (CRC), Movement for the Comoros (MPC) and the Djawabu Party (DJAWABU).

Biography 
Halidi later became an advisor to Anjouan President Mohamed Bacar. Following the March 2008 invasion of Anjouan, which toppled Bacar, Halidi was found in hiding, along with Mohamed Abdou Mmadi and Ahmed Abdallah Sourette, on March 29 near Domoni and was arrested.

References

External links
 Article concerning presidential run-off
 BBC article concerning presidential election

Living people
1954 births
People from Anjouan
Comorian prisoners and detainees
Prisoners and detainees of the Comoros
Prime Ministers of the Comoros
Candidates for President of the Comoros
Heads of government who were later imprisoned